André Lombard (born 19 September 1950) is a Swiss chess player born in Bern.  Lombard won the Swiss Chess Championship five times: 1969, 1970, 1973, 1974, and 1977.  He also played on the Swiss team in all five Chess Olympiads from 1970 to 1978. Lombard received the International Master title in 1976.

References

External links
 
 

1950 births
Swiss chess players
Chess International Masters
Sportspeople from Bern
Living people